Street Legal is a New Zealand legal drama focused on the lives of a small group of lawyers. The show was produced by ScreenWorks. A total of four series consisting of 53 episodes were aired between 11 July 2000 and 21 August 2003.

History
Producer Chris Hampson, director Chris Bailey and writer Greg McGee formed a production company, ScreenWorks, in 1998 to produce Street Legal, which they had been developing since 1993. The pilot aired in 1998 and the first series in 2000.

Synopsis
The show focused mainly on the lives of the partners of the law firm Wyeth & Associates located in Auckland, New Zealand. The characters include Peter Wyeth (Series 1–3), David Silesi, Joni Collins, Tim O'Connor (Series 1 and 2) and James Peabody (Series 3 and 4). Also seen were Judge Adriana Saunders, Yalena (the goofy secretary), Kees Van Dam, Ange Watson (Series 4), Sadie O'Neil (Series 2 and 3) and Matt Urlich (Series 3 and 4).

The main character David Silesi (Jay Laga'aia) is a maverick lawyer who pushes the limits of the law. He will do anything for his clients and his friends. He also spends most of the show pining for his law partner Joni Collins. Joni Collins is a level-headed female lawyer at Wyeth & Associates. In the 3rd Series, David and Joni join and buy out the firm to save it after Peter dies in unfortunate circumstances.

Cast

Main 
 Jay Laga'aia as David Silesi
 Katherine Kennard as Joni Collins
 Daniel Gillies as Tim O'Connor (series 1–2)
 Charles Mesure as Kees Van Dam
 Dwayne Cameron as James Peabody (series 3–4)

Recurring 
 Kate Elliott as Melanie Wyeth (series 1–3)
 Carl Bland as Peter Wyeth (series 1–2)
 Louise Wallace as Adriana Saunders
 Ben Baker as Samson Silesi (series 1)
 Sara Wiseman as Louise Jarvis (series 1)
 Cal Wilson as Yalena
 Andrew Binns as Det. Sr. Sgt. Jack Clifford (series 2)
 Ingrid Park as Maddy McGuire (series 2–4)
 Manu Bennett as Matt Urlich (series 3–4)
 Tandi Wright as Ange Watson (series 4)

Main characters
David Silesi is an unconventional lawyer. Ambitious, and hot-headed, he's a man with a passion for winning and he's not afraid to bend the rules to get a result. He is the central character in Street Legal and was specifically created with actor, Jay Laga'aia, in mind.

Joni Collins is a colleague of David Silesi's at Wyeth and Associates. Her cool restrained English Rose quality is the very opposite of David's braggadocio. This worked well when they were lovers but now that they have to run the business between them, it creates a lot of conflict.

Detective Senior Sergeant Kees Van Dam sees himself as an honest cop relentlessly pursuing the course of justice. And most of the time he is. Bit he can also be uncompromising and single-minded to the exclusion of all else, including his love for Joni Collins.

A 1944 Ford Jailbar was also seen in just about every episode of the first three series. It is David Silesi's main companion. Early in the first series, David's Ute was stolen, so his brother seeing his reaction to the truck decided to buy it for him. In the middle of the third series, the truck broke down, and was never seen again, replaced by a brand new Holden Ute.

Awards and nominations

Academy of Film and Television Arts

References

External links 
 
 
 

2000 New Zealand television series debuts
2003 New Zealand television series endings
New Zealand drama television series
Television shows funded by NZ on Air